Antseza is a town and commune in Madagascar. It belongs to the district of Mitsinjo, which is a part of Boeny Region. The population of the commune was estimated to be approximately 9,000 in 2001 commune census.

Antseza has a riverine harbour. Only primary schooling is available. The majority 75% of the population of the commune are farmers, while an additional 5% receives their livelihood from raising livestock. The most important crops are rice and raffia palm, while other important agricultural products are bananas and cassava.  Services provide employment for 1% of the population. Additionally fishing employs 19% of the population.

References and notes 

Populated places in Boeny